The First Baptist Church in Elizabethtown, Kentucky, originally known as Severn's Valley Baptist Church, is a historic church at 112 W. Poplar Street.  It was built in 1855 and was a work of John Y. Hill, a tailor turned carpenter/builder.  It was added to the National Register of Historic Places in 1974.

Its pointed arch entrance is sided by brick pilasters.

References

Baptist churches in Kentucky
Churches on the National Register of Historic Places in Kentucky
Churches in Hardin County, Kentucky
National Register of Historic Places in Hardin County, Kentucky
Elizabethtown, Kentucky
1855 establishments in Kentucky
Churches completed in 1855